Pyli (before 1926: Βίνενι - Vineni) is a village in the Florina Regional Unit in West Macedonia, Greece.

Name
The toponym Винени, Vineni is composed of the suffix -eni and the Slavic word for wine, vino. In Albanian, the village is called Vinan.

Demographics 
Until 1860, the village had a Slavonic population and a church of Sveti Ǵorǵi (Saint George). The village became inhabited by Muslim Albanians, numbering some 155 in 1900 and the expelled Slavonic population went to live in Medovo (modern Mileonas). At the time, Vineni was moved to a higher location due to bad climatic conditions. 

The Greek census (1920) recorded 202 people in the village and in 1923 there were 202 inhabitants (or 36 families) who were Muslim. The Albanian village population was present until 1926 and were replaced with prosfiges (Greek refugees), due to the Greek-Turkish population exchange. In 1926 within Vineni there were 18 refugee families from Asia Minor and 4 refugee families from an unidentified location. The Greek census (1928) recorded 173 village inhabitants. There were 24 refugee families (97 people) in 1928. During the Greek Civil War, the Greek refugee population fled to nearby Orovnik (modern Karyes) and later other prosfiges (Greek refugees) were brought to repopulate the village. 

By the 1950s, the Greek government assisted a group of nomadic transhumant Aromanians (known as the Arvanitovlachs) originating from Thessaly, to settle in depopulated villages of the Prespa region like Pyli. Aromanians are the only inhabitants of the village.

Pyli had 137 inhabitants in 1981. In fieldwork done by Riki Van Boeschoten in late 1993, Pyli was populated by Aromanians. The Aromanian language was spoken in the village by people over 30 in public and private settings. Children understood the language, but mostly did not use it.

References

External links
Prespes website

Populated places in Florina (regional unit)